Canada participated at the 2003 Pan American Games, held in Santo Domingo, Dominican Republic, from 1 to 17 August 2003.

Medals

Gold

Men's 800 metres: Achraf Tadili
Men's discus throw: Jason Tunks
Women's long jump: Alice Falaiye

Men's singles: Mike Beres
Women's doubles: Charmaine Reid and Helen Nichol
Mixed doubles: Denyse Julien and Philippe Bourret

Men's C-1 1000 m: Tom Hall
Women's K-4 500 m: Jennifer Adamson, Jillian D'Alessio, Emille Fournel and Victoria Tuttle

Women's points race: Clara Hughes

Men's 3 m springboard: Alexandre Despatie
Men's 3 m synchronized springboard: Alexandre Despatie and Philippe Comtois
Men's 10 m synchronized platform: Alexandre Despatie and Philippe Comtois
Women's 3 m springboard: Blythe Hartley
Women's 10 m platform: Émilie Heymans
Women's 3 m synchronized springboard: Émilie Heymans and Blythe Hartley
Women's 10 m synchronized platform: Émilie Heymans and Marie-Ève Marleau

Dressage individual: Leslie Reid

Silver

Men's marathon: Bruce Deacon
Men's 3000 m steeplechase: Joël Bourgeois
Women's 100 m hurdles: Perdita Felicien
Women's heptathlon: Nicole Haynes

Men's singles: Andrew Dabeka
Women's singles: Anna Rice
Women's doubles: Denyse Julien and Anna Rice
Mixed doubles: Patrick Jody and Mike Beres

Men's doubles: George Lambert and Danyck Brière

Men's C-1 500 m: Scott Dickey
Women's K-2 500 m: Emille Fournel and Victoria Tuttle

Women's individual road time trial: Clara Hughes

Women's 3 m springboard: Émilie Heymans

Dressage team: Evi Strasser, Jacqueline Brooks, Ashley Holzer and Leslie Reid

Women's épée individual: Sherraine Schalm

Women's tournament: Canada

Men's Kumite (68 kg): Saeed Baghbani
Women's Kumite (+58 kg): Btissama Essadiqi

Men's singles: Mike Green

Women's tournament: national team

Bronze

Men's 100 metres: Anson Henry
Men's shot put: Bradley Snyder
Women's pole vault: Stephanie McCann

Men's singles: Kyle Hunter
Men's doubles: Kyle Hunter and Mike Beres

Men's bantamweight (54 kg): Andrew Kooner
Men's middleweight (75 kg): Jean Pascal
Men's heavyweight (91 kg): Jason Douglas

Men's K-1 500 m: Mark de Jonge
Men's C-2 500 m: Ian Mortimer and Tom Hall
Women's K-1 500 m: Jillian D'Alessio

Women's individual pursuit: Clara Hughes

Men's 10 m platform: Alexandre Despatie
Women's 10 m platform: Blythe Hartley

Men's sabre individual: Michel Boulos
Women's épée team: Sherraine Schalm, Catherine Dunnette and Marie-Ève Pelletier

Women's Kumite (58 kg): Nassim Varasteh

Men's doubles: Corey Osborne and François Viens
Women's singles: Lori-Jane Powell
Women's doubles: Josée Grand'Maître and Julie Neubauer

Men's tournament: national team

Results by event

Athletics

Track

Road

Field

Heptathlon

Basketball

Men's tournament
Randy Nohr
Rowan Barrett
Prosper Karangwa
Greg Newton
Shawn Swords
Novell Thomas
Jesse Young
Peter Guarasci
Greg Francis
Andy Kwiatkowski
Juan Mendez
Mike King
Head coach:
Jay Triano

Women's tournament
Cal Bouchard
Claudia Brassard
Leighann Doan
Carolyn Ganes
Isabelle Grenier
Michelle Hendry
Nikki Johnson
Teresa Kliendienst
Susan Murray
Dianne Norman
Kim Smith
Shona Thorburn
Head coach:
Allison McNeill

Boxing

Swimming

Men's competitions

Women's competitions

Triathlon

References

See also

Canada at the 2004 Summer Olympics

Nations at the 2003 Pan American Games
Pan American Games
2003